The Duel is the fourth studio album by singer/songwriter Allison Moorer. The album was Moorer's first on an independent label and was recorded in 11 days with a small band made up of John Davis (Superdrag), guitarist Adam Landry (Stateside) and producer R.S. Field. The album was her last with her ex-husband, the songwriter and producer Doyle Lee Primm.

Track listing

Personnel
 Steve Conn - organ, piano
 John Davis - bass guitar, Fender Rhodes, electric guitar, steel guitar, organ, piano, background vocals
 R.S. Field - drums, percussion
 Allison Moorer - acoustic guitar, electric guitar, piano, lead vocals, background vocals
 Sonny Red - harmonica

Chart performance

References

2004 albums
Allison Moorer albums
Sugar Hill Records albums